Ceiba is both a small town and a municipality in northeast Puerto Rico. It is named after the famous Ceiba tree. Ceiba is located in the north-east coast of the island, bordering the Atlantic Ocean, south of Fajardo, north of Naguabo and southeast of Río Grande. Located about one hour's driving distance from San Juan, Ceiba is spread over 7 barrios and Ceiba Pueblo (the downtown area and administrative center). It is part of the Fajardo Metropolitan Statistical Area.

History
Ceiba was founded on April 7, 1838 by Luis de la Cruz. Ceiba derives its name from an Indian word Seyba, which is the name for a famous tree that grows in the island, the Ceiba pentandra (Kapok tree).

Puerto Rico was ceded by Spain in the aftermath of the Spanish–American War under the terms of the Treaty of Paris of 1898 and became a territory of the United States. In 1899, the United States Department of War conducted a census of Puerto Rico and the population numbers of Ceiba were consolidated with the population numbers of Fajardo.

Ceiba, situated near Fajardo, used to be home of an American military Naval base, the Roosevelt Roads Naval Station. Most of the units were relocated and the base was closed in 2004. Ex-governor Sila María Calderón suggested turning the property into a major international airport, to serve as a relief to Luis Muñoz Marín International Airport in San Juan, and to increase the number of international airlines that operate into Puerto Rico. She was met with skepticism about these plans from such groups as environmentalists, economists and others, but in 2008, José Aponte de la Torre Airport was inaugurated at the base's former site.

Locals are commonly known as "Los Come Sopa" (Spanish for 'the soup-eaters'). Even though there is no official reason as to why they are called this, a few stories have been suggested. Among the tales is the belief that since the town did not have a local meat market people had to travel long distances in order to buy some meat and therefore mostly ate soup. 

Hurricane Maria on September 20, 2017 triggered numerous landslides in Ceiba. Forty-nine structures in Punta Figuera were destroyed completely. In July 2018, some residents received monies via FEMA to rebuild their homes.

Geography
The Reserva Natural Medio Mundo y Daguao (Nature Reserve Medio Mundo and Daguao) extends along the coastline between Ceiba and Fajardo. 95% of the forest is classified as mangrove. Various species of birds can be seen as well as turtles and manatees. Its rivers includes; Río Daguao, Río Demajagua and Río Fajardo.

The municipality extends northwest into the seas between Fajardo and Culebra and thereby includes the reefs and islets named Arrecifes Hermanos and Arrecifes Barriles. The reef are closest to the coastal barrio of Machos, but barrio boundaries are not defined in that area.

The highest point in the municipality is Pico del Oeste in the Sierra de Luquillo at 3,346 feet (1,020 m) of elevation.

Barrios

Like all municipalities of Puerto Rico, Ceiba is subdivided into barrios.
Ceiba barrio-pueblo
Chupacallos
Daguao
Guayacán
Machos
Quebrada Seca
Río Abajo
Saco

Sectors

Barrios (which are like minor civil divisions) in turn are further subdivided into smaller local populated place areas/units called sectores (sectors in English). The types of sectores may vary, from normally sector to urbanización to reparto to barriada to residencial, among others.

Special Communities

 (Special Communities of Puerto Rico) are marginalized communities whose citizens are experiencing a certain amount of social exclusion. A map shows these communities occur in nearly every municipality of the commonwealth. Of the 742 places that were on the list in 2014, the following barrios, communities, sectors, or neighborhoods were in Ceiba: Saco, Las Calderonas, Parcelas Aguas Claras, Parcelas Nuevas, Prado Hermoso, and Quebrada Seca.

Climate

Demographics

Tourism

Landmarks and places of interest

There are 60 beaches in Ceiba, including  Beach.
Other places of interest include:
 Ceiba Historic Mural
Ensenada Honda
 Medio Mundo Beach
 Roosevelt Roads Base (a former United States Navy installation which is now closed)
 The cellist Pablo Casals lived in Ceiba.

Culture

Festivals and events
Ceiba celebrates its patron saint festival in June. The  is a religious and cultural celebration that generally features parades, games, artisans, amusement rides, regional food, and live entertainment.

Other festivals and events celebrated in Ceiba include:
 - February
 - March
 or Marlin Festival- May or June
 - October
 - November

Sports
Former IBF world Jr. Middleweight boxing champion Carlos Santos hails from Ceiba. Ceiba also has an amateur AAA baseball team Los Marlins de Ceiba.
Chi-Chi Rodriguez, Pro golfer is from Ceiba.

Economy
Manufacturing (plywood, apparel, hardware products).

Transportation
José Aponte de la Torre Airport offers commercial (mostly domestic) flights on four airlines; it also houses an MD-82 jet donated by American Airlines to local air mechanics students.

There are 29 bridges in Ceiba.

Notable people
People who were born in, residents of, or otherwise closely associated with Ceiba include:
 Carlos Santos - former IBF Junior Middleweight Champion of the World.
 Luis Vigoreaux - radio and television show host, announcer, comedian and producer. Luis Vigoreaux was found murdered on January 17, 1983. His wife Lydia Echevarria arranged his murder.
 Domingo Quiñones - although born in Perth Amboy, New Jersey; Domingo Quiñones moved to Ceiba at the early age of 4 and lived there until the age of 14.
 Pablo Casals - built his home in Ceiba at the age of 80; the place was known as "El Pesebre".
 Rogelio Figueroa Garcia - was born in Naguabo, Puerto Rico; however, was raised in Parcelas Aguas Claras (Barrio El Corcho) in Ceiba. He is a Puerto Rican engineer, a politician, and the co-founder of the Puerto Ricans for Puerto Rico (PPR) political party.
 McJoe Arroyo - IBF Super Flyweight world boxing champion
 Jaron Brown - is a wide receiver for the Seattle Seahawks. He was born in Ceiba, PR.
 Isabel Rosado Morales - was born in Barrio Chupacallo in Ceiba, Puerto Rico. She studied in La Universidad de Puerto Rico, Recinto de Rico Piedras and obtained a bachellor's degree in Education and Social Work. During the 1930s she was a rural teacher, position she held during 14 years. Alongside Blanca Canales, Carmen Rivera de Alvarado and other women, she was a founding member of La Sociedad Insular de Trabajadores Sociales, known today as Colegio de Trabajadores Sociales de Puerto Rico. She was a member of the Puerto Rican Nationalist Party and activist for the Puerto Rican Independence Movement. She lived until reaching the age of 107.

Government

All municipalities in Puerto Rico are administered by a mayor, elected every four years. The current mayor of Ceiba is Angelo Cruz Ramos, of the New Progressive Party (PNP). He was elected at the 2012 general elections.

The city belongs to the Puerto Rico Senatorial district VIII, which is represented by two Senators. In 2012, Pedro A. Rodríguez and Luis Daniel Rivera were elected as District Senators.

Symbols
The  has an official flag and coat of arms.

Flag
Ceiba's flag derives its design and colors from the municipal coat of arms. This maintains the same symbolism given to the coat of arms. It is made of two vertical lines of the same width, red in the left side and green on the right. The red side depicts a yellow cross.

Coat of arms
The Ceiba coat of arms depicts a shield with a Ceiba tree. In the upper part of the shield is a red horizontal space with a golden cross in the middle and a golden fleur-de-lis on either side. The cross symbolizes the Christian faith as well recognizing Luis de la Cruz as Ceiba's founder. Around the shield are sugar cane stalks. Above the shield there is a golden Spanish fort.

See also

List of Puerto Ricans
History of Puerto Rico
 Roosevelt Roads Naval Station
Did you know-Puerto Rico?

References

Further reading

External links 
 News out of Ceiba on Presencia PR

 
Municipalities of Puerto Rico
Populated places established in 1838
Fajardo metropolitan area
1838 establishments in Puerto Rico